USS Weeks may refer to more than one United States Navy ship:

 , a destroyer escort cancelled in 1944
 , a destroyer in commission from 1944 to 1970

United States Navy ship names